Pao palustris is a species of pufferfish in the family Tetraodontidae. It was described in 2013 as Tetraodon palustris by Pasakorn Saenjundaeng, Chavalit Vidthayanon, and Chaiwut Grudpan from the Mekong basin of Thailand. FishBase lists this species (as Tetraodon palustris) as a synonym of Pao brevirostris, although ITIS lists Pao palustris as a valid species.

References 

Tetraodontidae